Ness Ziona (Nes Tziyona) is a city in Central District, Israel.

History

Early history
Lying within Ness Ziona's city bounds is the ruin of the Arab village of Sarafand al-Kharab, formerly known as Ṣarfān (צרפאן), but called in Hebrew Ginnot Tzarifin, not to be confused with the IDF base Tzrifin. A story is related in the Babylonian Talmud about Ginnot Tzarifin, that during the time of the Second Temple it was customary to enquire where the first of the barley harvest and wheat harvest (Omer) were reaped when they were brought to the Temple, as it was not permissible to bring them from outside the land of Israel. Once, when the Omer was brought to Jerusalem, they knew not whence it had come. They enquired of a deaf-mute who knew where it had come from and who, mimicking with his hands, pointed to makeshift booths (Heb. "tzarifin"), and pointed to rooftops (Heb. "gagot"), the only word that he could find that rhymed with the word "gardens" (ginnot). The sages, asking if there was such a place called Gagot Tzarifin (Lit. Rooftops of the booths), were hard-pressed to recall such a place, until at last they remembered that there was a place called Ginnot Tzarifin, and accepted of the man's offering of the Omer.

Wadi Chanin/Nahalat Reuben 

Ness Ziona was at one point known as Wadi Chanin after a local Arab village, and Nahalat Reuben (lit. "Reuben's Estate") after Reuben Lehrer, who owned the land and started the Jewish settlement there in 1883.

In 1878, the German Templer Gustav Reisler purchased lands in Wadi Hunayn, planted an orchard, and lived there with his family. The name "Wadi-Chanin", with its German orthography, became the standard Western name for the place for several decades to come. After losing his wife and children to malaria, Reisler returned to Europe. He travelled to Odessa in 1882 and met Reuben Lehrer , a religiously observant Russian Jew with Zionist ideals, who had his own farmland there. Reisler traded his parcel of land in Palestine for Lehrer's land in Russia. Lehrer made aliyah (emigrated to Palestine) with his eldest son Moshe in 1883, bringing his wife and another four of his children over the following year.

Lehrer placed advertisements near Jaffa port asking others to join him offering plots in his land for a small amount of money. The pioneers that arrived established a neighborhood named Tel Aviv (the city of Tel Aviv did not yet exist) although the area was still known as Wadi Chanin, from its Arabic name, Wadi Hunayn. In 1888, Avraham Yalovsky, a blacksmith, was killed defending his workshop from Arab gangs.

Ness Ziona
In 1891, Michael Halperin bought more land in the wadi. He gathered a group of people on the Hill of Love and unfurled a blue and white flag emblazoned with the words Ness Ziona ("Banner to Zion") written in gold. The name is based on a verse in the Book of Jeremiah, Jeremiah 4:6. This flag was similar to the official Flag of Israel adopted at the First Zionist Congress seven years later.

United village
Eventually, the two Jewish settlements - the old Wadi Chanin/Nahalat Reuben and the newer Ness Ziona - grew into one larger village, together with the Arab Wadi Hunayn across the Jaffa-Jerusalem road. Until the 1948 Arab–Israeli War, it was the only mixed Arab-Jewish village in Mandatory Palestine. The coexistence was, on the whole, a peaceful one.

British Mandate
According to a census conducted in 1922 by the British Mandate authorities, Ness Ziona had a population of 319 Jews. By the 1931 census it had increased to 1,013 inhabitants, in 221 houses. In 1921 a pump and a system of water pipes were installed. In 1924 the British Army contracted the Israel Electric Company for wired electric power. The contract allowed the Electric Company to extend the grid beyond the original geographical limits that had been projected by the concession it was given. The high-tension line that exceeded the limits of the original concession ran along some major towns and agricultural settlements, offering extended connections to the Jewish settlements of Rishon Le-Zion, Nes-Ziona and Rehovot (in spite of their proximity to the high-tension line, the Arab towns of Ramleh and Lydda remained unconnected). The Great Synagogue of Ness Ziona was built in the 1920s, during the period of the Third Aliyah.

Arab attacks

Ness Ziona was attacked by Arab forces during the 1936–39 Arab Revolt, and the 1948 Arab–Israeli War. The outlying villages of Kfar Aharon and Tirat Shalom (now part of Ness Ziona) frequently exchanged fire with the Arab villages al-Qubayba and Zarnuqa (now western Rehovot). Most of Ness Ziona's youth joined the Haganah to fight off these threats. On May 15, 1948, Sarafand al-Kharab was evacuated of Arab inhabitants, and on May 19, al-Qubayba and Zarnuqa were conquered by the Givati Brigade. Much of the territory abandoned by the fleeing Arab residents of nearby villages was added to Ness Ziona, increasing its size from  immediately after the war.

After the establishment of the state

During the war, Ness Ziona's population almost tripled to become 4,446 (according to an October 23, 1949 survey), and until 1950 the local council absorbed 9,000 olim, most of whom were housed in ma'abarot. In 1952 a new industrial zone was approved for the town on an area of 70 dunams. In 1955, a second industrial zone was approved.

Geography

The city is bordered to the north by Rishon LeZion, to the east by Be'er Ya'akov, and to the south by Rehovot. Beit Hanan, Beit Oved, Ayanot youth village and Kibbutz Netzer Sereni also border the city. The city has been designed to have a rural character due to urban planning that bans the construction of buildings higher than eight stories. Property values have risen by 30 percent in recent years.

Neighborhoods
Ness Ziona is composed of a central core and villages that came under its municipal jurisdiction over time. The city also has two industrial zones and a high-tech park, Kiryat Weizmann.

Demographics
According to the Israeli Central Bureau of Statistics (CBS), in 2005 the ethnic makeup of the city was 99.6% Jewish and other non-Arabs. At the end of 2004 there were 612 immigrants (2.2%), although this rose sharply to 7.8% in 2005. The city also receives significant internal migration, and is popular among Tel Aviv residents seeking to leave the city.

In 2005 there were 14,400 males and 14,900 females. 31.8% of the population was 19 years of age or younger, 15.2% between 20 and 29, 21% between 30 and 44, 19.1% from 45 to 59, 3.1% from 60 to 64, and 9.7% 65 years of age or older. The population growth rate in 2006 was 5.8%.

In 2005, there were 11,830 salaried workers and 984 self-employed. The mean monthly wage 
for a salaried worker was NIS 7,597, a 9.2% increase over 2000. Salaried males had a mean monthly wage of NIS 9,802 (an 8.4% increase) versus NIS 5,595 for females (a 14% increase). The mean income for the self-employed was 7,064. There were 290 people receiving unemployment benefits and 986 receiving an income guarantee (welfare).

Economy
Ness Ziona is home to the Israel Institute for Biological Research (IIBR), a secret government defence research institute working in chemical and biological research with 350 employees, and Zenith Solar, a solar energy company. The Kiryat Weizmann Science Park is a magnet for many Israeli start-ups, among them Indigo Digital Press, which was acquired by Hewlett-Packard in 2002 and manufactures high-end digital printing presses.

Education

Schools
Until 1961 there was only elementary school in Ness Ziona. In 1961 (שנת הלימודים תשכ"ב), Ben Gurion High school was opened.

there are 20 schools in Ness Ziona

 Elementary: "Rishonim", "Eshkol", "Savionim", "Ben Zvi", "Hadar", "Shaked", "Nizanim", "Argaman", "Lev HaMoshava", "Irus", "Sadot" and "Shibolim".
 Religious: "Reut", "Habad".
 High Schools: "Golda", "Ben Gurion", "Eliezer Ben Yehuda", "Park HaMada".
 Special Education: "HaTomer", "Dklaim".

Youth Organizations
The following youth organizations have chapters in Ness Ziona:
 Bnei Akiva
 HaNoar HaOved VeHaLomed
 Maccabi youth movement
 Hebrew Scouts Movement in Israel
 Krembo Wings
 Moadonchik
 Israel Gay Youth

Sports

The city has been represented in the top division of Israeli football by two different clubs; Maccabi Ness Ziona competed in the top flight in the first post-independence season. However, they lost all 24 games, and were relegated. A new club, Sektzia Ness Ziona was formed in 1956 and reached the top flight in 1966. However, they were relegated after only one season. After folding, they reformed as Ironi Ness Ziona in 2001, and since then have reverted to their former name and reached Liga Leumit, the second tier. The club plays at the Ness Ziona Stadium.

The town is also home to a basketball team, Ironi Nes Ziona B.C., playing in the national premier league.

Transportation
Ness Ziona has two main roads – Highway 42 to the west, and Road 412 (Weizmann Street), which goes through the city center and connects to Rishon LeZion and Rehovot.

Notable people
Avigdor Kahalani (born 1944), soldier and politician
Avraham Katz (1931–1986), politician
Tamir Nabaty (born 1991), chess grandmaster
Ya'akov Shahar (born 1941), owner of Maccabi Haifa
Shimi Tavori (born 1953), singer
Pini Zahavi (born 1955), football agent 
Dror Zeigerman (born 1948), politician and diplomat
Misha Zilberman (born 1989), Olympic badminton player

Twin towns – sister cities

Ness Ziona is twinned with:
 Freiberg, Germany
 Le Grand-Quevilly, France
 Solingen, Germany
 Qingdao, China
 Piotrków Trybunalski, Poland

See also
Population groups in Israel
Nahala (disambiguation page), Hebrew word for heritage or estate widely used for toponyms in Israel

References

External links
Official website

 
1883 establishments in the Ottoman Empire
Cities in Central District (Israel)
Cities in Israel
Tegart forts
Populated places established in 1883